Aliso Creek (also Aliso Canyon Wash or Aliso Wash) is a major tributary of the Upper Los Angeles River in the Santa Susana Mountains in Los Angeles County and western San Fernando Valley in the City of Los Angeles, California.

It is the second major tributary, after Browns Canyon Wash−Creek, to enter the Los Angeles River downstream of its headwaters at the confluence of Bell Creek and Arroyo Calabasas in Canoga Park.

Course

During its first , it is a free-flowing stream mostly contained within Aliso Canyon Park and Eddlestone Park on the border of Granada Hills and Porter Ranch. After it passes under State Route 118 (Simi Valley Freeway) and enters Northridge, it empties into a retention basin and from there on is encased in a concrete flood control channel flowing southward across the San Fernando Valley. Upstream of Plummer Street Wilbur Canyon Wash enters it, and shortly after that downstream Limekiln Wash enters it, both on the right bank.

In Reseda the Aliso Creek channel makes a 90-degree bend to the east, south of Vanowen Avenue and west of West Valley Park, flowing a short distance to its confluence with the Los Angeles River, north of Victory Boulevard between Wilbur Avenue and Reseda Boulevard.

Crossings and tributaries
From northern Santa Susana Mountains source to southern mouth (year built in parentheses):

Rinaldi Street
California State Route 118 - Ronald Reagan Freeway (1980)
Concrete flood channel opening
San Fernando Mission Road
Tribune Street
Chatsworth Street
San Jose Street [Pedestrian Bridge] (1967)
Service bridges
Devonshire Street 
Lemarsh Street
Reseda Boulevard (1950)
Lassen Street (1966)
Yolanda Avenue (1963)
Limekiln Canyon Wash enters
Wilbur Avenue (1969)
Plummer Street (1967)
Nordhoff Street (1969)
Wilbur Canyon Wash enters
Railroad: Union Pacific Coast Line, Metrolink Ventura County Line
Parthenia Street (1955)
Chase Street [Pedestrian Bridge] (1958)
Roscoe Boulevard (1955)
Wilbur Avenue (1955)
Strathern Street (1952)
Arminta Street [Pedestrian Bridge] (1960)
Saticoy Street (1954)
Valerio Street [Pedestrian Bridge] (1976)
Sherman Way (1954)
Hart Street [Pedestrian Bridge] (1954)
Vanowen Street (1954)
Confluence with the Los Angeles River channel

See also
Aliso Canyon gas leak
Aliso Canyon Oil Field

References

Rivers of Los Angeles County, California
Tributaries of the Los Angeles River
Geography of the San Fernando Valley
Santa Susana Mountains
Granada Hills, Los Angeles
Northridge, Los Angeles
Porter Ranch, Los Angeles
Reseda, Los Angeles
Rivers of Southern California